The United Indonesia Coalition is an official political coalition in Indonesia which was formed through a political agreement between three political parties from the Onward Indonesia Coalition, namely the Golkar, National Mandate Party, and United Development Party, in the face of the 2024 Indonesian presidential election.

On 12 May 2022, the three leaders of the constituent parties held a meeting in Menteng, Central Jakarta. They are Airlangga Hartarto (Golkar), Zulkifli Hasan (PAN), and Suharso Monoarfa (PPP). The word "United" has a philosophy, namely Beringin, Surya, and Baitullah, while the three are symbols of each of the political parties founding the coalition.

Member parties

General election results

References 

Political party alliances in Indonesia
Political parties established in 2022